The Rivière des Roches is a tributary of the rivière du Berger flowing in the sectors Beauport and Charlesbourg in Quebec City, in the region of Capitale-Nationale, in the province of Quebec, in Canada. Taking its source in the Lac des Roches, it has a length of approximately 5.3 km.

The valley of the Roches river does not have a road except its upper part which is served east of Lac des Roches by Arthur-Drolet road and northeast by Lac-des-Roches road. While its lower part crosses an urban area.

The surface of the Rivière des Roches (except the rapids areas) is generally frozen from the beginning of December to the end of March; however, safe circulation on the ice is generally done from the end of December to the beginning of March. The water level of the river varies with the seasons and the precipitation; the spring flood occurs in March or April.

Geography 
The Roches River is one of the main tributaries of the watershed of the rivière du Berger.

  in a southerly direction, widens temporarily to become the Petit lac des Roches up to its mouth where a dam has been built.
  to the south by entering a residential area in the Orsainville district where its environment is protected by the Rivière-des-Roches linear park before whether it is, for the most part, channeled or privatized over the rest of its route to its confluence with the Berger river.

History 
The river was partly channeled in the 1970s and 1980 due to residential construction.

In 2009, the development of a new residential sector (the “Domaine Rivière des Roches” project) further up the river, raised concerns about environmental protection. A citizen consultation session is held on 15 September 2009. During the fall, the contractor Sébastien Leboeuf decides to immediately begin the work of felling without authorization from the city., causing the illegal cutting of hundreds of trees. The project was adjusted in 2010 to make more room for the environment of the Roches River. The Rivière-des-Roches linear park was created thereafter and the City built paths and walkways there.

Toponymy 
The toponym "Rivière des Roches" is based on the rocky character of the bottom of the river.

The toponym "Rivière des Roches" was formalized on December 5, 1968, at the Commission de toponymie du Québec.

Gallery

See also 

List of rivers of Quebec

References 

Rivers of Capitale-Nationale
Landforms of Quebec City